Michelle Dilhara is a Sri Lankan actress, presenter and a philanthropist. She has appeared in over Fifteen teledramas. This is a list of roles performed by Michelle Dilhara.Currently she holds the record for the most likes on a Facebook post in Sri Lanka.  She became popular as Podi Patharakari in Salsapuna Teledrama on Sirasa TV.

Appearances in Tele-dramas

Filmography

Television shows

Television advertisements

Music videos

References

External links
 
 Amateur actress Michelle brings girls of Children's Home who said 'haven't seen Colombo hotels' for a lunch ... to Cinnamon Grand
 Michelle dilhara on IMDB

Actress filmographies